Social influence comprises the ways in which individuals adjust their behavior to meet the demands of a social environment. It takes many forms and can be seen in conformity, socialization, peer pressure, obedience, leadership, persuasion, sales, and marketing. Typically social influence results from a specific action, command, or request, but people also alter their attitudes and behaviors in response to what they perceive others might do or think. In 1958, Harvard psychologist Herbert Kelman identified three broad varieties of social influence.

Compliance is when people appear to agree with others but actually keep their dissenting opinions private.
Identification is when people are influenced by someone who is liked and respected, such as a famous celebrity.
Internalization is when people accept a belief or behavior and agree both publicly and privately.

Morton Deutsch and Harold Gerard described two psychological needs that lead humans to conform to the expectations of others. These include our need to be right (informational social influence) and our need to be liked (normative social influence). Informational influence (or social proof) is an influence to accept information from another as evidence about reality. Informational influence comes into play when people are uncertain, either because stimuli are intrinsically ambiguous or because there is social disagreement. Normative influence is an influence to conform to the positive expectations of others. In terms of Kelman's typology, normative influence leads to public compliance, whereas informational influence leads to private acceptance.

Types
Social influence is a broad term that relates to many different phenomena. Listed below are some major types of social influence that are being researched in the field of social psychology. For more information, follow the main article links provided.

Kelman's varieties
There are three processes of attitude change as defined by Harvard psychologist Herbert Kelman in a 1958 paper published in the Journal of Conflict Resolution. The purpose of defining these processes was to help determine the effects of social influence: for example, to separate public conformity (behavior) from private acceptance (personal belief).

Compliance

Compliance is the act of responding favorably to an explicit or implicit request offered by others. Technically, compliance is a change in behavior but not necessarily in attitude; one can comply due to mere obedience or by otherwise opting to withhold private thoughts due to social pressures. According to Kelman's 1958 paper, the satisfaction derived from compliance is due to the social effect of the accepting influence (i.e., people comply for an expected reward or punishment-aversion).

Identification

Identification is the changing of attitudes or behaviors due to the influence of someone who is admired. Advertisements that rely upon celebrity endorsements to market their products are taking advantage of this phenomenon. According to Kelman, the desired relationship that the identifier relates to the behavior or attitude change.

Internalization

Internalization is the process of acceptance of a set of norms established by people or groups that are influential to the individual. The individual accepts the influence because the content of the influence accepted is intrinsically rewarding. It is congruent with the individual's value system, and according to Kelman the "reward" of internalization is "the content of the new behavior".

Conformity

Conformity is a type of social influence involving a change in behavior, belief, or thinking to align with those of others or with normative standards. It is the most common and pervasive form of social influence. Social psychology research in conformity tends to distinguish between two varieties: informational conformity (also called social proof, or "internalization" in Kelman's terms ) and normative conformity ("compliance" in Kelman's terms).

In the case of peer pressure, a person is convinced to do something that they might not want to do (such as taking illegal drugs) but which they perceive as "necessary" to keep a positive relationship with other people (such as their friends). Conformity from peer pressure generally results from identification with the group members or from compliance of some members to appease others.

Minority influence

Researchers have been studying social influence and minority influence for over thirty years. The first publication covering these topics was written by social psychologist Serge Moscovici and published in 1976. Minority influence takes place when a majority is influenced to accept the beliefs or behaviors of a minority. Minority influence can be affected by the sizes of majority and minority groups, the level of consistency of the minority group, and situational factors (such as the affluence or social importance of the minority). Minority influence most often operates through informational social influence (as opposed to normative social influence) because the majority may be indifferent to the liking of the minority.

Self-fulfilling prophecy

A self-fulfilling prophecy is a prediction that directly or indirectly causes itself to become true due to positive feedback between belief and behavior. A prophecy declared as truth (when it is actually false) may sufficiently influence people, either through fear or logical confusion, so that their reactions ultimately fulfill the once-false prophecy. This term is credited to sociologist Robert K. Merton from an article he published in 1948.

Social contagion

Social contagion involves the spontaneous spread of behaviors or emotions through a group, population or social network. Social contagion consists of two categories, behavioral contagion and emotional contagion. Unlike conformity, the emotion or behavior being adopted may not represent a social norm.

Reactance

Reactance is the adoption of a view contrary to the view that a person is being pressured to accept, perhaps due to a perceived threat to behavioral freedoms. This phenomenon has also been called anticonformity. While the results are the opposite of what the influencer intended, the reactive behavior is a result of social pressure. It is notable that anticonformity does not necessarily mean independence. In many studies, reactance manifests itself in a deliberate rejection of an influence, even if the influence is clearly correct.

Obedience

Obedience is a form of social influence that derives from an authority figure, based on order or command. The Milgram experiment, Zimbardo's Stanford prison experiment, and the Hofling hospital experiment are three particularly well-known experiments on obedience, and they all conclude that humans are surprisingly obedient in the presence of perceived legitimate authority figures.

Persuasion

Persuasion is the process of guiding oneself or another toward the adoption of an attitude by rational or symbolic means. US psychologist Robert Cialdini defined six "weapons of influence": reciprocity, commitment, social proof, authority, liking, and scarcity to bring about conformity by directed means. Persuasion can occur through appeals to reason or appeals to emotion.

Psychological manipulation

Psychological manipulation is a type of social influence that aims to change the behavior or perception of others through abusive, deceptive, or underhanded tactics. By advancing the interests of the manipulator, often at another's expense, such methods could be considered exploitative, abusive, devious, and deceptive.
 
Social influence is not necessarily negative. For example, doctors can try to persuade patients to change unhealthy habits. Social influence is generally perceived to be harmless when it respects the right of the influenced to accept or reject it, and is not unduly coercive. Depending on the context and motivations, social influence may constitute underhanded manipulation.

Abusive power and control

Controlling abusers use various tactics to exert power and control over their victims. Tactics may include coercion and threats, intimidation, emotional abuse, isolation, and more. The goal of the abuser is to control and intimidate the victim or to influence them to feel that they do not have an equal voice in the relationship.

Propaganda

Propaganda is information that is not objective and is used primarily to influence an audience and further an agenda, often by presenting facts selectively to encourage a particular synthesis or perception, or using loaded language to produce an emotional rather than a rational response to the information that is presented.

Hard power

Hard power is the use of military and economic means to influence the behavior or interests of other political bodies. This form of political power is often aggressive (coercion), and is most effective when imposed by one political body upon another of lesser military and/or economic power.  Hard power contrasts with soft power, which comes from diplomacy, culture and history.

Antecedents 
Many factors can affect the impact of social influence.

Social impact theory

Social impact theory was developed by Bibb Latané in 1981. This theory asserts that there are three factors which increase a person's likelihood to respond to social influence:

Strength: The importance of the influencing group to the individual
Immediacy: Physical (and temporal) proximity of the influencing group to the individual at the time of the influence attempt
Number: The number of people in the group

Cialdini's "weapons of influence"
Robert Cialdini defines six "weapons of influence" that can contribute to an individual's propensity to be influenced by a persuader:
Reciprocity: People tend to return a favor.
Commitment and consistency: People do not like to be self-contradictory. Once they commit to an idea or behavior, they are averse to changing their minds without good reason.
Social proof: People will be more open to things that they see others doing. For example, seeing others compost their organic waste after finishing a meal may influence the subject to do so as well.
Authority: People will tend to obey authority figures.
Liking: People are more easily swayed by people they like.
Scarcity: A perceived limitation of resources will generate demand.

Unanimity
Social Influence is strongest when the group perpetrating it is consistent and committed. Even a single instance of dissent can greatly wane the strength of an influence. For example, in Milgram's first set of obedience experiments, 65% of participants complied with fake authority figures to administer "maximum shocks" to a confederate. In iterations of the Milgram experiment where three people administered shocks (two of whom were confederates), once one confederate disobeyed, only ten percent of subjects administered the maximum shocks.

Status 

Those perceived as experts may exert social influence as a result of their perceived expertise. This involves credibility, a tool of social influence from which one draws upon the notion of trust. People believe an individual to be credible for a variety of reasons, such as perceived experience, attractiveness, knowledge, etc. Additionally, pressure to maintain one's reputation and not be viewed as fringe may increase the tendency to agree with the group. This phenomenon is known as groupthink. Appeals to authority may especially effect norms of obedience. The compliance of normal humans to authority in the famous Milgram experiment demonstrate the power of perceived authority.

Those with access to the media may use this access in an attempt to influence the public. For example, a politician may use speeches to persuade the public to support issues that he or she does not have the power to impose on the public. This is often referred to as using the "bully pulpit." Likewise, celebrities don't usually possess any political power, but they are familiar to many of the world's citizens and, therefore, possess social status.

Power is one of the biggest reasons an individual feels the need to follow through with the suggestions of another. A person who possesses more authority (or is perceived as being more powerful) than others in a group is an icon or is most "popular" within a group. This person has the most influence over others. For example, in a child's school life, people who seem to control the perceptions of the students at school are most powerful in having a social influence over other children.

Culture 

Culture appears to play a role in the willingness of an individual to conform to the standards of a group. Stanley Milgram found that conformity was higher in Norway than in France. This has been attributed to Norway's longstanding tradition of social responsibility, compared to France's cultural focus on individualism. Japan likewise has a collectivist culture and thus a higher propensity to conformity. However, a 1970 Asch-style study found that when alienated, Japanese students were more susceptible to anticonformity (giving answers that were incorrect even when the group had collaborated on correct answers) one third of the time, significantly higher than has been seen in Asch studies in the past.

While gender does not significantly affect a person's likelihood to conform, under certain conditions  gender roles do affect such a likelihood. Studies from the 1950s and 1960s concluded that women were more likely to conform than men. But a 1971 study found that experimenter bias was involved; all of the researchers were male, while all of the research participants were female. Studies thereafter found that the likelihood to conform almost equal between the genders. Furthermore, men conformed more often when faced with traditionally feminine topics, and women conformed more often when presented with masculine topics. In other words, ignorance about a subject can lead a person to defer to "social proof".

Emotions 

Emotion and disposition may affect an individual's likelihood of conformity or anticonformity. In 2009, a study concluded that fear increases the chance of agreeing with a group, while romance or lust increases the chance of going against the group.

Social structure

Social networks

A social network is a social structure made up of nodes (representing individuals or organizations) which are connected (through ties, also called edges, connections, or links) by one or more types of interdependency (such as friendship, common interests or beliefs, sexual relations, or kinship). Social network analysis uses the lens of network theory to examine social relationships. Social network analysis as a field has become more prominent since the mid-20th century in determining the channels and effects of social influence. For example, Christakis and Fowler found that social networks transmit states and behaviors such as obesity, smoking, drinking and happiness.

However, important flaws have been identified in the contagion model for social influence which is assumed and used in many of the above studies. In order to address these flaws, causal inference methods have been proposed instead, to systematically disentangle social influence from other possible confounding causes when using observational data.

Global approach to the phenomenon of influence

Provisional introduction

As described above, theoretical approaches are in the form of knowledge clusters. A global theory of Influence is missing  for an easy understanding and an education to protect from manipulators.A first tentative was published in 2012. The first pages of "Influence & Systems" explain the reason why we need a global approach.

See also

References

External links

Influence
 
Majority–minority relations